VIS1 (viral integration site 1), also known as HIS-1, is a long non-coding RNA. It was originally identified in mice in a screen for genes involved in the development of myeloid leukemia. In murine myeloid leukemias, this gene is a common site of viral insertion by the murine ecotropic retrovirus CasBrM It is conserved amongst vertebrates, including human, mice, cats, pigs, cattle and dogs. Expression of VIS1 is restricted to epithelial cells, leukemias and carcinomas.

See also
 Long noncoding RNA

References

Non-coding RNA